Battlefield Football Club, often referred to as The Battlefield, was a 19th-century football club based in Langside, in Glasgow.  The club took its name from the site of the Battle of Langside in 1568.

History
The club's foundation was inspired by neighbours Queen's Park F.C. and eight of the club's initial membership were also members of the Hampden side.  The club's membership was middle-class "gentlemanly" players, with a reputation for clean play that "cultivat[ed] the science of the game". 

Although the club's foundation date was given as 1873, the first reported match for the club took place in October 1879, and first Scottish Cup entry was in 1881.

Battlefield had a reputation for causing shocks.  In the 1883-84 Scottish Cup, the club beat South Western F.C. in the Scottish Cup first round 8-1, "contrary to expectations".  Battlefield reached the quarter-finals that season, which the club matched the following season, in which the club pulled off its biggest shock; beating Queen's Park 3-2 in the third round.

Queen's Park protested on several bases, including having one goal wrongly disallowed, and three of the Battlefield players not having been registered, but the protests were dismissed.  The size of the shock can be measured by Queen's Park reaching the FA Cup final that season.

Queen's Park felt the loss strongly and there were accusations that Battlefield was "poaching" players from Queen's Park; indeed one Smith, a member of the Queen's Park committee and secretary of Battlefield, was removed from his position at Queen's Park because of his alleged attempts at "tapping up".

After beating Pollokshields Athletic F.C., conquerors of Dumbarton F.C., in the fourth round, Battlefield were considered favourites to win the competition,  The club was drawn to play Cambuslang F.C. in the quarter-finals at Kinning Park, but Battlefield did not turn up, due to the "hardness of the ground", and claimed the match had been postponed; indeed no referee turned up either.  Cambuslang kicked a goal and claimed the tie.  Battlefield's protest was upheld, but the replay was ordered to take place in Cambuslang.  A special train was put on from Glasgow to bring the Battlefield support, and Battlefield was 1-0 up at half-time thanks to a Sellar header, but the home side turned it around to win 3-1.

With many amateur players having dual membership with Queen's Park and another club, and choosing more and more to play for the former, Battlefield boosted its ranks by taking over Pollokshields Athletic in late 1888.  The instant result was a 2-1 win over Rangers F.C. at Ibrox Park, but the boost did not last long, and in the next year's Glasgow Cup, Battlefield suffered an 8-1 defeat to Queen's Park.

In the 1893-94 Scottish Cup, the club beat Scottish League club Thistle F.C. 3-1 in the first round, one of the first times a non-league side beat a League side.  Battlefield lost in a second round replay to Abercorn.  

The 1893-94 upset was the club's final success; professionalism and the various Scottish leagues had taken their toll on the club, with players either retiring or moving to professional clubs.  Also, despite the club's success on the national stage, within Glasgow the club had never been prominent, with Queen's Park and Third Lanark F.C. on the club's doorstep, and other clubs in Glasgow having been paying players in secret from the 1880s onwards.

The club's final Scottish Cup tie was in the first round against St Mirren in 1894; after losing the tie, Battlefield protested on the basis that one of the Saints was under suspension for playing in an unsanctioned match.  The Scottish FA upheld the protest, but St Mirren won the replayed tie by a larger margin.

The final reported senior matches for the club come from the 1896-97 season, when it was forced mostly to play friendlies.  In 1897-98, the club scratched from the Glasgow Cup before playing a tie, and by the start of the next season the club had been definitively wound up.

Colours

The club's colours were black and white "stripes", possibly in honour of Queen's Park.

Grounds

The club originally played at Overdale Park.  In 1884 the club moved to Mossfield Park, four miles from the city centre.

Notable players

William Sellar, who won 5 caps for the Scotland national side as a Battlefield player.

Donald Sillars, future Scotland international

Records

Cups
Scottish Cup: 
Best run: quarter-finals 1883-84, 1884-85

Glasgow Cup
Best run: second round 1889-90, 1891-92

Scoring

Record competitive win: 11-0 v United Abstainers of Crosshill, Scottish Cup 1st Round, 22 September 1888.
Record competitive defeat: 0-7 v Queen's Park, Glasgow Cup 1st Round, 19 September 1896.

References

External links
Scottish Football Club Directory
RSSSF: Scottish Cup

Defunct football clubs in Scotland
Football clubs in Glasgow
Association football clubs established in 1873
Association football clubs disestablished in 1898
1873 establishments in Scotland
1878 disestablishments in Scotland